The MLS Cup is the annual championship match of Major League Soccer (MLS), the top-level men's soccer league for the United States and Canada. The match marks the conclusion of the MLS Cup Playoffs, a four-round knockout competition contested by the top six teams from each of the league's two conferences. The playoffs tournament is organized by the league at the end of the regular season in a format which is similar to other professional sports leagues in the United States and Canada, but unlike most soccer leagues. The league also awards the Supporters' Shield to teams that have the most points during the regular season. Both the MLS Cup champion and Supporters' Shield winner qualify for the CONCACAF Champions League, contested by the champions of CONCACAF leagues in North America, Central America, and the Caribbean. The MLS Cup champion also qualifies for the Campeones Cup, a friendly held since 2018 against the winners of the Mexican Campeón de Campeones from Liga MX.

First contested in 1996, the MLS Cup was originally hosted by a predetermined neutral site selected by the league before the regular season. Since the 2012 edition, the match has been hosted by the remaining team with the highest regular season standing. The final, originally contested in October, was moved to November and later December as the length of the regular season and playoffs were extended by the league. The playoffs originally allowed for lower-ranked seeds, known as wild cards, to be placed into different sides of the bracket regardless of their actual conference. As a result, several MLS Cups have featured two teams from the same conference.

Los Angeles FC are the reigning cup-holders, having defeated the Philadelphia Union in the 2022 final for their first title. The Los Angeles Galaxy hold the record for most MLS Cup titles, having won five times in nine appearances. The championship has been won by the same team in two or more consecutive years on three occasions, and the match has featured consecutive sets of finalists on three occasions. Four finals have featured two teams participating as finalists for the first time. Nine teams have also won "the double", claiming the MLS Cup and either the Supporters' Shield, the U.S. Open Cup, or the Canadian Championship during the same season; only Toronto FC has won a treble, having achieved it in 2017. Landon Donovan has played in seven MLS Cup finals and totaled 726 minutes—both competition records.

The highest recorded attendance for the MLS Cup was set in the 2018 final, with 73,019 spectators at Mercedes-Benz Stadium in Atlanta, Georgia. From 1996 to 2008, the English broadcast of the MLS Cup was carried in the United States on terrestrial network ABC; it was moved to sister channel ESPN for the following seven editions. From 2015 to 2022, ESPN and Fox held rights to alternating editions of the cup; the 2019 cup, originally slated to be broadcast on ESPN, was moved to ABC. The Spanish language rights for the MLS Cup in the U.S. were awarded to Univision in 2007 and the match was aired on their various networks until 2023. The U.S. linear television rights beginning in 2023 are held by Fox in English and Fox Deportes in Spanish; the MLS Cup final will air on those channels as well as Apple TV+'s MLS Season Pass streaming service worldwide. In Canada, the MLS Cup has been broadcast in English by TSN since 2011 and in French by TVA Sports since 2017. The largest television audience for an MLS Cup broadcast was the 2016 final, which drew 3.5 million viewers in the United States and Canada.

Finals

Results by team

, 19 of the 31 teams that have played in the league have appeared at an MLS Cup final, and 15 have won a championship. The LA Galaxy has appeared at and won the MLS Cup the most times, with five championships in nine appearances. The New England Revolution has appeared five times as a finalist, but has not won an MLS Cup. The Chicago Fire won the MLS Cup in their inaugural season in 1998, a feat previously performed by the Philadelphia Atoms in the predecessor of the MLS, NASL, in 1973.

Stadiums

From 1996 to 2011, the MLS Cup was hosted by a neutral site selected before the start of the season in a manner similar to the National Football League's Super Bowl championship. Three teams advanced to the final after being named as hosts: D.C. United in 1997, the New England Revolution in 2002, and the Los Angeles Galaxy in 2011. Since the 2012 edition, the match has been hosted by the finalist with the highest regular season standing. Several teams with smaller or inadequate stadiums have also considered using larger American football stadiums to host the MLS Cup, but all post-2012 editions have been played at regular MLS venues. The move towards a non-neutral venue was deemed a risk due to the cold November and December weather in some northern cities, as well as the lack of adequate stadiums for some teams.

The MLS Cup has been hosted in 13 stadiums across 10 metropolitan areas in the United States and Canada. Dignity Health Sports Park, previously named the Home Depot Center and StubHub Center, in Carson, California, has hosted the MLS Cup the most times of any venue, with six editions between 2003 and 2014. The Los Angeles metropolitan area has hosted the MLS Cup eight times at three venues: the Rose Bowl, Dignity Health Sports Park, and Banc of California Stadium. The largest attendance for an MLS Cup final was the 2018 edition at Mercedes-Benz Stadium in Atlanta, Georgia, with 73,019 spectators; the smallest was in 2020 at Mapfre Stadium in Columbus, Ohio, with only 1,500 spectators allowed due to the COVID-19 pandemic. Only three editions have been hosted outside the United States, all at BMO Field in Toronto, Canada.

See also
List of American and Canadian soccer champions

Notes

References

External links
Highlights from MLSsoccer.com

Finals
Mls
Mls Cup Finals
Lists of football champions